Antimicrobial stewardship is the systematic effort to educate and persuade prescribers of antimicrobials to follow evidence-based prescribing, in order to stem antimicrobial overuse, and thus antimicrobial resistance. AMS has been an organized effort of specialists in infectious diseases, both in Internal Medicine and Pediatrics with their respective peer-organizations, hospital pharmacists,  the public health community and their professional organizations since the late 1990s. It has first been implemented in hospitals. In the U.S., within the context of physicians' prescribing freedom (choice of prescription drugs), AMS had largely been voluntary self-regulation in the form of policies and appeals to adhere to a prescribing self-discipline until 2017, when the Joint Commission prescribed that hospitals should have an Antimicrobial Stewardship team, which was expanded to the outpatient setting in 2020.

As of 2019, California and Missouri had made AMS programs mandatory by law.

Definition and goals
The 2007 definition by the Society for Healthcare Epidemiology of America (SHEA) defines AMS as a "set of coordinated strategies to improve the use of antimicrobial medications with the goal to 
 enhance patient health outcomes, 
 reduce antibiotic resistance, and 
 decrease unnecessary costs".

Decreasing the overuse of antimicrobials is expected to serve the following goals:
 improve patient outcomes, especially patient safety 
 decrease adverse drug reactions such as hypersensitivity reactions or kidney or heart damage (e.g., QT prolongation).
 decrease antibiotic-associated disease, such as Clostridium difficile–associated diarrhea, other antibiotic-associated diarrheas, and invasive candidiasis
 guard the patient's microbiome, including the gut flora, respiratory tract flora, urogenital tract flora, and skin flora (this is closely related to the preceding goal of preventing antibiotic-associated disease)
 decrease wasted costs
 slow the increase in antimicrobial resistance
 prevent unforeseen environmental degradation, such as likely adverse effects of altering biotas and animal microbiotas by pervading the water cycle with antimicrobials in wastewater

History
Antimicrobial misuse was recognized as early as the 1940s, when Alexander Fleming remarked on penicillin's decreasing efficacy, because of its overuse.

In 1966, the first systematic assessment of antibiotic use in the Winnipeg, Manitoba, Canada general hospital was published: Medical records were reviewed during two non-consecutive four-month periods (medicine, psychiatry, urology, gynecology and surgery, orthopedics, neurosurgery, ear, nose and throat, and ophthalmology). Information was coded on punched cards using 78 columns.
Others in 1968 estimated that 50% of antimicrobial use was either unnecessary or inappropriate. This figure is likely the lower end of the estimate, and continues to be referenced as of 2015.

In the 1970s the first clinical pharmacy services were established in North American hospitals. The first formal evaluation of antibiotic use in children regarding antibiotic choice, dose and necessity of treatment was undertaken at The Children's Hospital of Winnipeg. Researchers observed errors in therapy in 30% of medical orders and 63% of surgical orders.  The most frequent error was unnecessary treatment found in 13% of medical and 45% of surgical orders. The authors stated "Many find it difficult to accept that there are standards against which therapy may be judged."

In the 1980s the antibiotic class of cephalosporins was introduced, further increasing bacterial resistance. During this decade infection control programs began to be established in hospitals, which systematically recorded and investigated hospital-acquired infections. Evidence-based treatment guidelines and regulation of antibiotic use surfaced. Australian researchers published the first medical guideline outcomes research.

The term AMS was coined in 1996 by two internists at Emory University School of Medicine, John McGowan and Dale Gerding, a specialist on C. difficile. They suggested "...large-scale, well-controlled trials of antimicrobial use regulation employing sophisticated epidemiologic methods, molecular biological organism typing, and precise resistance mechanism analysis [...] to determine the best methods to prevent and control this problem [antimicrobial resistance] and ensure our optimal antimicrobial use stewardship" and that "...the long-term effects of antimicrobial selection, dosage, and duration of treatment on resistance development should be a part of every antimicrobial treatment decision."

In 1997, SHEA and the Infectious Diseases Society of America published guidelines to prevent antimicrobial resistance arguing that "…appropriate antimicrobial stewardship, that includes optimal selection, dose, and duration of treatment, as well as control of antibiotic use, will prevent or slow the emergence of resistance among microorganisms."

Ten years later, in 2007, bacterial, antiviral and antifungal resistance had risen to such a degree that the CDC rang the alarm . The same year, IDSA and SHEA published guidelines for developing an AMS program.  Also in 2007, the first pediatric publication used the term AMS.

A survey of pediatric infectious disease consultants in 2008 by the Emerging Infectious Disease Network revealed that only 45 (33%) respondents had an AMS program (ASP), mostly from before 2000, and another 25 (18%) planned an ASP (data unpublished).

In 2012, the SHEA, IDSA and PIDS published a joint policy statement on AMS.

The CDC's NHSN has been monitoring antimicrobial use and resistance in hospitals that volunteer to provide data.

On September 18, 2014, PresidentBarack Obama issued an Executive Order 13676, "Combating Antibiotic-Resistant Bacteria.' This Executive Order charged a Task Force to develop a 5-Year action plan that included steps to reduce the emergence and spread of antibiotic-resistant bacteria and ensure continued availability of effective therapies for infections. Improved AMS is one of the charges of this Executive Order. The Presidential Advisory Council on Combating Antibiotic-Resistant Bacteria (PACCARB) was formed in response to this Executive Order.

In 2014, the CDC recommended, that all US hospitals have an antibiotic stewardship program (ASP).

On January 1, 2017 Joint Commission regulations went into effect detailing that hospitals should have an AMS team consisting of infection preventionist(s), pharmacist(s), and a practitioner to write protocols and develop projects focused on the appropriate use of antibiotics. Effective January 1, 2020, the Joint Commission antimicrobial stewardship requirements were expanded to  outpatient health care organizations as well. In 2018, a survey of AMS programs in the US showed each 0.50 increase in pharmacist and physician full-time equivalent support predicted a roughly 1.5-fold increase in the programs effectiveness. but in a 2019 survey 45% of responding physicians reported that their institution provided no support for their ASP services.

Locations
AMS is needed wherever antimicrobials are prescribed in human medicine, namely in acute care hospitals, outpatient clinics, and long-term care institutions, including hospice.

Guidelines for prudent or judicious use in veterinary medicine have been developed by the Canadian Veterinary Medicine Association in 2008. A particular problem is that veterinarians are both prescribers and dispensers. As of 2012, regulators and the Federation of Veterinarians of Europe had been discussing the separation of these activities.

Participants

Antimicrobial stewardship focuses on prescribers, be it physician, physician assistant, nurse practitioner, on the prescription and the microorganism, if any. At a hospital, AMS can be organized in the form of an AMS committee that meets monthly. The day-to-day work is done by a core group, usually an infectious disease physician, who may or may not serve in hospital epidemiology and infection control, or/ and an infectious diseases or antimicrobial certified pharmacist, ideally but rarely aided by an information technologist. In most cases, both the infectious diseases physician and the infectious diseases pharmacist co-chair the AMS committee and both serve as the directors and champions of the AMS program and committee. The entire committee may include physician representatives, who are top antimicrobial prescribers such as physicians in intensive care medicine, Hematology -Oncology, cystic fibrosis clinicians or hospitalists, a microbiologist, a quality improvement (QI) specialist, and a representative from hospital administration.  Six infectious diseases organizations, SHEA, Infectious Diseases Society of America, MAD-ID, National Foundation for Infectious Diseases PIDS, and Society of Infectious Disease Pharmacists, published joint guidance for the knowledge and skills required for antimicrobial stewardship leaders.

For an AMS program to be established the institution has to recognize its value. In the US it has become customary to present a business plan to the executive officers of the hospital administration.

AMS program components
In the US, the CDC recommends essential components of AMS programs (ASP) for acute care hospitals, small and critical access hospitals, resource-limited facilities, long-term care facilities, and outpatient facilities.

As of 2014, thirteen internet-based institutional ASP resources in US academic medical centers had been published. An ASP has the following tasks, in line with quality improvement theory:

Baseline assessment 
Parts of the baseline assessment are to:
Measure baseline antimicrobial use, dosing, duration, costs and use patterns.
Study type of microbial isolates, susceptibilities, and trends thereof
Identify clinician indication for prescriptions.

In hospitals and clinics using electronic medical records, information technology resources are crucial to focusing on these questions. As of 2015, commercial computer surveillance software programs for microbiology and antimicrobial administrations appear to outnumber "homegrown" institutional programs, and include, but are not limited to TREAT Steward, TheraDoc, Sentri7, and Vigilanz.

Goals of desirable antimicrobial use 
For the desired antimicrobial use, goals need to be formulated:
Define "appropriate", rational antimicrobial use for the institution, individual patient units, and define empiric treatment versus culture-directed antimicrobial treatment.
Establish treatment guidelines for clinical syndromes. These can be disseminated in the form of memos, in-services or grand rounds and may be most effective in the form of decision-making tools at the point of ordering the prescription.

Interventions on antimicrobial prescribing
The actual interventions on antimicrobial prescribing consist of numerous elements

Provide feedback, continuing education
Survey prescriber knowledge about antibiotics, antifungal or antiviral drugs.
Provide targeted education about particular antibiotics, or one specific antimicrobial at a time, as well as empiric treatment for syndromes versus culture directed treatment.
Assist in making duration more visible to prescribers. Some institutions use automatic stop orders.
Decreasing diagnostic uncertainty by appropriate testing, including rapid diagnostic methods. The most effective strategy to decrease diagnostic uncertainty would be to align the focus with other safety projects, and QI measures (e.g. blood management, adverse effects etc.).

Biomerieux has published case studies of countries that introduced AMS.

Interventions
The day-to-day work of the core AMS members is to screen patients' medical records in a prospective audit for some of the following questions, in order of importance:
Appropriate antimicrobial choice based on susceptibility, avoiding redundance ?
Appropriate dose (mg/kg dosing in children) ?
Appropriate dosing interval according to age, weight and renal function or drug-drug interaction? 
Appropriate deescalation of antimicrobials after culture results are final ?
Appropriate administration route and feasibility of drug conversion from intravenous to by mouth (PO)? 
 
If the answer is no, the team needs to effectively communicate a recommendation, which may be in person or in the medical record.

Further tasks are:
Automatic review of the medical record after 72h empiric use, culture results, other laboratory data 
Advise on appropriate duration of antimicrobial therapy
Annual report to administration, calculation of cost savings if any.

Outcomes to measure
In 2010, two pediatric infectious disease physicians suggested to look at the following variables to judge the outcome of AMS interventions: 
 Annual pharmacy acquisition costs 
 Antibiotic days/1,000 patient days 
 Identifying "drug-bug mismatches"
 IV to oral conversion
 Optimal dosing 
 Stopping redundant therapy
 Reducing adverse events
 Overall compliance with ASP recommendations
When examining the relationship between an outcome and an intervention, the epidemiological method of time series analysis is preferred, because it accounts for the dependence between time points.
A review of 825 studies evaluating any AMS intervention in a community or hospital setting revealed a low overall quality of antimicrobial stewardship studies, most not reporting clinical and microbiological outcome data.
A 2014 global stewardship survey identified barriers to the initiation, development and implementation of stewardship programmes internationally.

Controversies
At this time the optimal metrics to benchmark antimicrobial use are still controversial:  
To measure unit of antimicrobials consumed, one can use 'Days Of Therapy' (DOT) or Defined Daily Dose (DDD). The former is more commonly used in the US, the latter is more commonly used in Europe.
Data source for antimicrobial use: Where available, the electronic Medication Administration Record (eMAR) is the most accurate correlate for doses given, but it may be difficult to analyze, because of hold orders and patient refusal, as opposed to administrative data or pharmacy billing data, which may be easier to obtain.
The question of "appropriateness of use" is probably the most controversial. Appropriate use depends on the local antimicrobial resistance profile and therefore has different regional answers. Merely the "amount" of antibiotics used is no straightforward metric for appropriateness.
In regard to the most effective AMS intervention, the answer will depend on the size of the institution and the resources available: The system of "prior approval" of antimicrobials by infectious disease or pharmacology consultants has been used first historically. It is very time- and labor-intensive, and prescribers do not like its restrictive character. Increasingly, "post-prescription review" is used. 
It can be difficult to decide if a clinical syndrome or a particular drug should be targeted for interventions and education. 
How to best  modify prescriber behavior has been the subject of controversy and research. At issue is how feedback is presented to prescribers, individually, in aggregate, with or without peer comparisons, and whether to reward or punish. 
As long as the best quality metrics for an AMS program are unknown, a combination of antimicrobial consumption, antimicrobial resistance, and antimicrobial and drug resistant organism related mortality are used.
Although education consistently shows improvement in participants' knowledge and attitudes, the results do not always translate to better AMS practice.
Unintended consequences of antimicrobial stewardship programs may include disagreement of infectious disease specialists with colleagues, jeopardizing provider autonomy and provider efficiency.

See also
Antibiotic resistance
Broad vs narrow-spectrum antibiotics

References

External links
Antimicrobial Stewardship: Implementation Tools & Resources Society for Healthcare Epidemiology of America (SHEA)
Core Elements of Hospital Antibiotic Stewardship Programs CDC
Antimicrobial Stewardship Project, at the Center for Infectious Disease Research and Policy (CIDRAP), University of Minnesota
Promoting Antimicrobial Stewardship in Human Medicine Infectious Diseases Society of America (IDSA)
Surveillance of antimicrobial use WHO
Commitments to Responsible Use of Antimicrobials in Humans WHO 13–14 November 2014 
Antibiotics in Groundwater Change Bacterial Ecology US Geological Survey, Toxic Substances Hydrology Program Antibiotics in Groundwater Change Bacterial Ecology

Antimicrobial resistance
Health care quality